Un asunto privado is a Spanish drama film coproduced by  Portuguese and Argentine producers.  It was filmed in Portugal.  It was released in 1996, directed by Imanol Arias, and written by José Ángel Esteban.

Cast
Jorge Perugorría as Alejandro
Antonio Valero as Bruno
Pastora Vega as Klaudia
Fabián Vena as Dario
Patricia Vico as Clienta

External links 
 

1996 films
1996 drama films
Argentine independent films
1990s Spanish-language films
Spanish independent films
Portuguese independent films
1990s Argentine films
1990s Spanish films